Potassium 2-ethylhexanoate, also known as potassium iso-octanoate, is a chemical used to convert the tert-butylammmonium salt of clavulanic acid into potassium clavulanate (clavulanate potassium). It is also used as a corrosion inhibitor in automotive antifreeze and as a catalyst for polyurethane systems.

References

Potassium compounds
Ethylhexanoates